Hakupu School Ground or Village Park, as it known to the local people, is a stadium based in Hakupu, a village in Niue. It is named after the Hakupu School and has a capacity of 200. The venue is home to the local club, Hakupu FC and to Makefu based team, Makefu FC.

References 

Soccer venues in Niue